Driscoll is a census-designated place in southeastern Burleigh County, North Dakota, United States. An unincorporated community, it was designated as part of the U.S. Census Bureau's Participant Statistical Areas Program on June 10, 2010. It was not counted separately during the 2000 Census, but was included in the 2010 Census, where a population of 82 was reported. In 2018, Driscoll was counted as a Census Designated Place, and had a population of 78.

Driscoll lies just off Interstate 94, east of the city of Bismarck, the county seat of Burleigh County. it had a post office, with the ZIP code 58532.

Journalist Era Bell Thompson grew up in Driscoll; hers was the only black family in town.

Demographics

History
Driscoll was named for Frederick Driscoll, a newspaper manager.

In June 2015, The Coal Car Diner closed. Three months later in September 2015, the owners of Norm's Grocery, and the cafe announced their retirement. On October 10, an auction was held and all remaining equipment and materials were sold. The grocery store had been a mainstay of the town, being open for 57 years. The towns Post Office was located in a small portion of the grocery store, which was forced to close as well. Donna Meland was postmaster and operated the cafe, while Norm Meland operated the store. Norm is quoted as saying “I hate to see it all go. It’s the end of the town, you might say." A local resident, Carol Christenson, says “It’ll be a learning experience for us, but it’s not going to be pleasant. We’ll say goodbye with tears in our eyes.” The Bismarck Tribune states: "Times changed. People became more mobile, the big supermarkets opened a half-hour away in Bismarck and the town’s population declined. As of July, there are 98 people living in the town, according to N.D. Home Town Locator." Mail has since been changed to rural service.

References

External links
 Driscoll, North Dakota, 1883-1970 from the Digital Horizons website

Census-designated places in Burleigh County, North Dakota
Census-designated places in North Dakota
Unincorporated communities in North Dakota
Unincorporated communities in Burleigh County, North Dakota